Elmore Theodore Elver (March 4, 1877 – May 19, 1921) was an American politician and lawyer.

Born in the town of Vermont, Dane County, Wisconsin, Elver moved to Madison, Wisconsin and went to high school. Elver graduated from the University of Wisconsin in 1898, and from its College of Law in 1901. He practiced law in Madison, Wisconsin. In 1907, Elver served in the Wisconsin State Assembly and was a Democrat. He died in a hospital in Madison, Wisconsin from pneumonia.

References

External links

1877 births
1921 deaths
Politicians from Madison, Wisconsin
University of Wisconsin–Madison alumni
University of Wisconsin Law School alumni
Lawyers from Madison, Wisconsin
People from Vienna, Wisconsin
19th-century American lawyers
Democratic Party members of the Wisconsin State Assembly